Mjölby ( or ) is a city and the seat of Mjölby Municipality, Östergötland County, Sweden with 12,245 inhabitants in 2010.

Mjölby is located by the rivulet Svartån. Due to the rapids of Svartån and the fertile soils of the surrounding plains, Mjölby is a natural place for a mill.

During the Dacke War in 1542–1543 Mjölby was the northernmost point reached by the rebels from Småland.

Main attractions
 Skogsjöområdets Naturreservat (Nature reserve and camping)
 Mjölby Hembygdsförening Donationsmedel (Park and garden)
 Runestones of Högby (Historical landmark)
 Örbackens kalkkärr (National reserve)

Sports
The following sports clubs are located in Mjölby:

 Mjölby AI FF
 Mjölby HC
 Mjölby Södra IF
 Mjölby Turabdin FC
 Mjölby Allmänna Ryttarsällskap
 Mjölby Ridklubb
 Mjölby IBK (Black bears)

Twinnings
 Hankasalmi, Finland

References

External links

Municipal seats of Östergötland County
Swedish municipal seats
Populated places in Östergötland County
Populated places in Mjölby Municipality